Burt Gillet's Toddle Tales is a theatrical cartoon series which lasted from June 29 to September 7, 1934, and was made by the Van Beuren Studios. All of the films combined live-action and animation.

History
Burt Gillet's Toddle Tales was a half animated, half live action film series from Van Beuren Studios. There were only 3 episodes released from the series, Grandfather's Clock, Along Came A Duck, and A Little Bird Told Me.

Grandfather's Clock
Grandfather's Clock is the 1st episode, which was theatrically aired on June 29, 1934. A little girl and her baby brother meet a grandfather clock who introduces them to clock children and show them what they do.

Along Came A Duck
Along Came A Duck was the 2nd episode, and was theatrically released on August 10, 1934. A little boy (live action) chases a poor duck to the pond where he runs into an animated croaking and singing bullfrog. Then the bullfrog tells the little boy the story of how he and the duck met years ago.

A Little Bird Told Me
A Little Bird Told Me is the 3rd episode, which was theatrically released on September 7, 1934. Little bird reporters and photographers led by "Walter Finchell" published the story of the real life boy that had his hands in the jam in the newspaper which was printed on leaves.

References

External links
Other studios

1934 animated films
1934 films
Films directed by Burt Gillett
Van Beuren Studios
American animated short films
1930s American films